Muricopsis matildeae is a species of small sea snail, a marine gastropod mollusk in the family Muricidae, the rock snails.

This species is endemic to São Tomé and Príncipe.

References

 Rolàn, E. & Fernandes, F., 1991. Muricopsis (Risomurex) (Gastropoda, Muricidae) de les islas de Sao Tomé y Principe (Golfo de Guinea, Africa occidental). Apex 6(1): 11-20

Muricidae
Endemic fauna of São Tomé and Príncipe
Invertebrates of São Tomé and Príncipe
Gastropods described in 1991
Taxonomy articles created by Polbot
Taxobox binomials not recognized by IUCN